Byron S. "By" Walton was a college football player, track star, and basketball player and coach at the University of Mississippi.

Early years
Walton attended Central High School in Philadelphia, Pennsylvania.

Ole Miss
He stood 6 feet tall and weighed 180 pounds.

Football
Walton was a prominent end for the Ole Miss Rebels football team. He was nominated though not selected for an Associated Press All-Time Southeast 1869-1919 era team.

1911
He was selected All-Southern in 1911. He once stripped Ray Morrison of Vanderbilt 10 yards short of the goal. Heisman describes Walton: "This chap weighs 180 stripped, is fast as a deer, willing as a shepherd dog, strong as an ox, and has the judgment of a football player. Against Mercer and Vanderbilt he was simply invulnerable; nothing could get around his end. And when it came to getting down the field and nailing his man under punts he proved himself a perfect demon."

Basketball
He played center and was captain and coach of the basketball team in 1911-1912.

Penn
Walton also attended the University of Pennsylvania.

Camp athletics
In 1917 Walton was appointed by the Fosdick Commission to direct Army camp athletics in Syracuse, New York.

References

All-Southern college football players
Ole Miss Rebels football players
Ole Miss Rebels men's basketball players
Ole Miss Rebels men's basketball coaches
American football ends
Centers (basketball)
Year of birth missing
Year of death missing
American men's basketball players